Boracho is an unincorporated community in Culberson County, Texas, in the United States.

History
A post office called Boracho was established in 1908, and closed in 1912, with Mary E. Glenn as postmistress. is derived from Spanish, meaning "drunk".

References

Unincorporated communities in Culberson County, Texas
Unincorporated communities in Texas